Antoine Rivez was a Belgian athlete who competed in the men's individual cross country event at the 1920 Summer Olympics.

References

Year of birth missing
Year of death missing
Athletes (track and field) at the 1920 Summer Olympics
Belgian male long-distance runners
Olympic athletes of Belgium
Place of birth missing
Olympic cross country runners